Ghulam Murtaza is a male Muslim given name. It may refer to

Ghulam Murtaza Shah Syed, known as G. M. Syed (1904–1995), Pakistani political leader who pioneered the Jeay Sindh movement 
Ghulam Murtaza (cricketer) (born 1980), Pakistani cricketer
Ghulam Murtaza (physicist) (born 1939), Pakistani plasma physicist and mathematician
Golam Mortaza (cricketer) (born 1980), Bangladeshi cricketer
Hafiz Ghulam Murtaza, a scholar and Sufi saint
Mirza Ghulam Murtaza (died 1876), Indian nobleman, military man and father of Mirza Ghulam Ahmad